Lithuania competed at the 2009 World Aquatics Championships in Rome, Italy.

Medalists

Diving

Lithuania qualified 2 quota places for the following diving events.

Men

Swimming

12 swimmers represented Lithuania:

Men

Women

References

Nations at the 2009 World Aquatics Championships
2009 in Lithuanian sport
Lithuania at the World Aquatics Championships